Al Bourke (born Alan Stamford; March 17, 1928) is an Australian professional boxer of the 1940s and 1950s who won the Victorian middleweight title, Australian middleweight title, and British Empire middleweight title, his professional fighting weight varied from , i.e. middleweight to , i.e. light heavyweight. Al Bourke was trained by Jack Carroll, and then Ambrose Palmer.

References

External links

Image - Al Bourke

1928 births
Light-heavyweight boxers
Living people
Middleweight boxers
Sportspeople from Hobart
Australian male boxers
Commonwealth Boxing Council champions